The Osu caste system is a traditional practice in Igboland that discourages social interaction and marriage with a group of persons called Osu (Igbo: outcast). Osus are dedicated to the deities (Alusi) of Igboland; they are considered as inferior beings and are usually separated from the Nwadiala or diala (Igbo: real born).

Origin
The origin of the osu caste system can be traced back to the era when the Igbo city-states were managed by the laws of the earth, known as Odinani. The deity known as Ala provided rules that must be obeyed by the people so that the nation would be blessed to prosper in the territory given to them by Chukwu, the Supreme God. Offenders who were found guilty of great abominations were cast away so as to avoid the anger of the earth Deity and to prevent the spread of abomination among the citizens of the state. These outcasts were identified as Osu. They were either sold to slavery to other men or were delivered to be enslaved to certain deities who were believed to ask for human sacrifice during festivals in order to clean the land from abomination, thus leading to the purchase of a slave by the people. Another view on the history of the osu caste system centres on ostracization. This occurs when a person or group of persons who refuses the orders of a king or the decision of a community are banished from the community, thus resulting in the victim and his descendants being called osus.

Discrimination
The osus are treated as inferior persons to the class of the diala people. The osus are made to live in shrines or marketplaces and are objected when seeking a romantic, marital and often congenial relationship outside of their cast. In Chinua Achebe's No Longer At Ease, he said osus are given separate seats in churches. The osus, who are also seen as unclean, are not allowed to break kola or make prayers on behalf of those outside of their caste because it is believed that they will bring calamity upon the society. This form of maltreatment and punishment have prompted the osus to flee to other countries for survival.

Criticism
Since the introduction of modernization in Igbo land, the osu caste system has been criticized by people who feel it is against human rights to freedom from discrimination. According to some human rights groups who are calling for its abolishment, some of the punishments meted out against the osu in Igboland include: parents administering poison to their children, disinheritance, ostracism, denial of membership in social clubs, violent disruption of marriage ceremonies, denial of chieftaincy titles, deprivation of property and expulsion of wives.

On 20 March 1956, Igbo legislators in the Eastern House of Assembly, Enugu abrogated the then common practice of referring to people as osus. The fines imposed have discouraged the public expression of the word osu.

Abolition
As history may have it, the Osu Caste System has been abolished on 28 December 2018 in a ceremony conducted in Nri, the acclaimed ancestral home of the Igbo nation, in Anaocha local government area of Anambra State. The title of the abolition ceremony was “Nigeria: Osu Caste System in Igboland Ends Today.” 

Also on 7 April 2021, another abolition ceremony took place in Nsukka, Enugu as 119 villages in the nine autonomous communities in Nsukka town, Nsukka Local Government Area of Enugu State, gathered to eradicate the Osu Caste System in their communities.

Different views have been made on this outrageous topic. The Osu Caste System is a practice in Igbo land where some people are tagged second-class citizens as against the freeborn, and therefore, are denied certain privileges enjoyed by those who are called freeborn. In this sense, second-class citizens are not allowed to marry a freeborn, and, are not qualified to take certain traditional titles which are exclusively reserved for the freeborn.

However, different opinions or views on the subject matter have been made by different people, making it impossible for the true evolution of the Osu Caste System in Igbo land to be understood, and it indicates that the majority of Igbo people in the present generation do not have evidence that prove when the Osu Caste System came into practice in Igbo land.

References

Further reading

Igbo culture
Igbo people